The Ahlon language, Igo, is spoken in the Plateau Region of Togo. It is considered one of the Ghana–Togo Mountain languages of the Kwa family. Variations of its official name are Achlo, Ahlõ, Ahlo, Ahlon-Bogo, Ahonlan, Anlo.

References

Ghana–Togo Mountain languages
Languages of Togo